Tuneweaving (released as Tie a Yellow Ribbon in the UK) is the third album by American popular music group Dawn (Tony Orlando, Telma Hopkins & Joyce Vincent Wilson) released in 1973 by Bell Records. The title track reached number one in both the US and UK. In terms of sales, this single was the most successful in the group's career, starting a string of seven consecutive Hot 100 appearances. Another track, "You're a Lady" by English singer/songwriter Peter Skellern, reached number 70 on the US charts. The group changed their name to "Tony Orlando and Dawn" later in 1973.

Track listing

Side 1
"Freedom for the Stallion" (Allen Toussaint) – 3:25
"Jolie" (Al Kooper) – 3:17
"When We All Sang Along" (Richard Snyder) – 3:26
"Runaway/Happy Together" (Del Shannon, Max Crook/Alan Gordon, Gary Bonner) – 3:38
"Easy Evil" (Alan O'Day) – 3:27

Side 2
"Tie a Yellow Ribbon Round the Ole Oak Tree" (Irwin Levine, L. Russell Brown) – 3:20
"You're a Lady" (Peter Skellern) – 4:45
"Lazy Susan" (Thomas Bell, Linda Creed) – 2:45
"Watch a Clown Break Down" (Dave Appell, Sandy Linzer) – 2:54
"I Can't Believe How Much I Love You" (Ardith Polley)  – 2:55
”I Don't Know You Anymore” (Sandy Linzer, Stephen Reinhardt) – 3:10

Musicians

Allan Schwartzberg - drums
Bob Mann, Jerry Friedman, Dave Appell - guitar
Stu Woods, Kirk Hamilton - bass
Frank Owens, Jon Stroll, Mitch Margo - keyboards
Jimmy Maelen, Hank Medress, George Devons - percussion
Gene Bianco - harp
Gilbert Chimes - harmonica
New York Strings
New York Horns

Voices
Tony Orlando – lead vocals 
Telma Louise Hopkins – backing vocals, Lead on "I Don't Know You Anymore"
Joyce Vincent Wilson – backing vocals, Lead on "Easy Evil"
Pam Vincent (sister of Joyce) – backing vocals 
Vocal Group Foundation

Production

Recorded at Century Sound Studio, NYC
Producers: Hank Medress, Dave Appell & The Tokens
Engineers: Bill Radice, Tom Cloeman
Mastering: Media Sound, NYC

References

1973 albums
Tony Orlando and Dawn albums
Bell Records albums
Albums with cover art by Joel Brodsky